Malahide railway station serves Malahide in Fingal (formerly north County Dublin).

Geography 

Just to the north of the station, the line crosses the Broadmeadow viaduct which is 164m long and is the most noticeable part of the Malahide Estuary.

History
The station opened on 25 May 1844 as part of the Dublin and Drogheda Railway. Earlier, on 6 January 1844, a special train for people including Lords Eliot and Talbot, their wives and other persons gave rides up and down a completed section of track near Malahide.

George Papworth created an elaborate design for the main station building in 1851, in the event this was not built.

A set of company amalgamations occurred in 1875-6 with the station first coming under the Northern Railway Co. (Ireland) and into the Great Northern Railway of Ireland (GNRI) on 1 April 1876. From 1 October 1958 with the break up of the GNRI the station came under the remit of CIÉ.

The main station building in the general polychromatic brickwork style of William Hemingway Mills has been attributed various dates from  1851 to 1905.

Malahide became the northern extent of the electrified Dublin Area Rapid Transit (DART) system in 2000.

Goods services were withdrawn in December 1974. In 2009, Malahide became the temporary terminus of all direct services from Dublin as a consequence of the collapse of the Broadmeadow viaduct.

Infrastructure
The station has two through lines and two platforms, the major one being on the east side which is the southbound track to Dublin. Entrance is via yellow brick polychrome style typical of Mills although some features are Malahide specific, notably the ornate wood sliding doors to the platform. The platform roof is supported by decorative ironwork. Access to the other platform is via a bridge with ironwork dating from the 1880s; this had to be raised high to allow for the DART electrification extension with disable-accessible lifts newly fitted to the south side. The west platform retains a wooden shelter in mostly original condition. That platform has also been extended at some point but a standard GNR signal box has been retained, albeit boarded up.

Operation
The station is staffed between 05:45-00:30, Monday to Sunday and platform 1 (the eastern or southbound platform) is fully accessible. Platform 2 (the western or northbound platform) can be accessed by a footbridge (with lifts) from platform 1 or via steps to the public road.

Services
Malahide is both a terminus on the DART system and a station on Northern Commuter services.

Bus links
Go-Ahead Ireland operated bus route 102 links the station to Dublin Airport, Sutton railway station and parts of Malahide. In October 2013 a shuttle bus linking various areas of the town to the station was introduced. Numbered route 842, it operates in the morning and evening peaks Mondays to Fridays inclusive. The service was temporarily suspended at the start of January 2014.

Gallery

See also
 List of railway stations in Ireland

References

Notes

Footnotes

Sources

External links 

 Irish Rail Malahide Station Website
 Eiretrains - Malahide Station

Iarnród Éireann stations in Fingal
Railway stations opened in 1844
Railway stations in Fingal
1844 establishments in Ireland
Railway stations in the Republic of Ireland opened in 1844